Yeh Na Thi Hamari Qismat is a Pakistani drama television series produced by Six Sigma Productions. It is directed by Syed Ali Raza Usama and written by Seema Munaf. The story revolve around four characters Muntaha, Ayaan , Yasir and Alishba played by Hira Mani,                      Muneeb Butt , Noor Hassan Rizvi and Aiza Awan respectively. It first aired on 24 January 2022 on ARY Digital.

Haroon Shahid replaced Noor Hassan in last four episodes of the show as Noor was unwell.

Plot

The story of two sisters who have different aspirations in life. The elder sister, Muntaha, is well educated and focused in life while the younger sister, Alishba, is carefree and looking for an easy life after marrying a rich person.

Cast 

 Hira Mani as Muntaha
 Muneeb Butt as Ayaan
 Noor Hassan Rizvi/Haroon Shahid as Yasir
 Aiza Awan as Alishba
 Annie Zaidi as Asiya; as Yasir Mother
 Khalid Anam as Khalid; Ayan Father
 Kinza Malik as Shireen; Khalid's sister and Saniya Mother
 Raja Haider as Wajahat Muntaha and Alishba Father
 Saba Faisal as Sajida; Ayan Mother
 Salma Hassan as Anila; Muntaha and Alishba Mother 
 Shehryar Zaidi as Sarmad Yasir Father
 Amna Malik as Saniya; Shireen's Daughter
 Hafsa Tariq Butt as Mehnaz; as Ayaan Sister

References 

Pakistani drama television series
2022 Pakistani television series debuts
2022 Pakistani television series endings